Alexandr Jurečka (18 December 1990 – 25 September 2015) was a judoka from the Czech Republic.

Sports career

2008–2012 
In 2012 Jurečka represented the Czech Republic at the European Judo Championships in Chelyabinsk, Russia.

2013–2015

Death 
Jurečka died on 25 September 2015 while scuba diving with friends in Lake Garda, Italy. The probable cause of Jurečka's death was a technical defect in his equipment.

Results

References

External links
 

1990 births
2015 deaths
Czech male judoka
Sport deaths in Italy
Underwater diving deaths
Universiade medalists in judo
Universiade bronze medalists for the Czech Republic
Medalists at the 2013 Summer Universiade
People from Havířov
Sportspeople from the Moravian-Silesian Region
20th-century Czech people
21st-century Czech people